Francesco Forti (born 26 July 1999) is an Italian tennis player.

Forti has a career high ATP singles ranking of 368 achieved on 12 July 2021. He also has a career high doubles ranking of 253 achieved on 7 March 2022.

Forti has won 1 ATP Challenger doubles title at the 2021 Internazionali di Tennis Città di Todi with Giulio Zeppieri.

Tour titles

Doubles

References

External links
 
 

1999 births
Living people
Italian male tennis players
People from Cesena
People from Cesenatico
Sportspeople from the Province of Forlì-Cesena
21st-century Italian people